Udo Pastörs (born 1952) is a German politician and convicted Holocaust denier. He is the former leader of the far-right NPD, and served as a representative in the Landtag of Mecklenburg-Vorpommern.

Personal life

Pastörs was born on 24 August 1952 in Wegberg, West Germany.

His learned profession is that of a clockmaker. He is married and has one daughter with his wife, Marianne Pastörs.

He joined the NPD in 2000. In 2005 he became the leader of the party in Mecklenburg-Vorpommern. He was first elected to state parliament in 2006, receiving 7.3% of the vote. He has been leading the party fraction since 2006.

Controversies
In a speech on 25 February 2009, Pastörs referred to the Federal Republic of Germany as a "Jew republic", to Turkish-German men as "semen cannons", and to Alan Greenspan as a "hook-nose". A local court found him guilty of "incitement of popular hatred" in May 2010, sentencing him to a suspended sentence of ten months and a €6,000 fine.

2019 European Court of Human Rights (ECHR or ECtHR) Decision 
On 3 October 2019, the European Court of Human Rights unanimously decided on the case Pastörs v. Germany (application no. 55225/14) that a decision from the German Courts sentencing him to eight months’ imprisonment, suspended on probation, based on the fact that a speech made by German politician Udo Pastörs stating that “the so-called Holocaust is being used for political and commercial purposes”, as well as other holocaust denial comments, incurred in violation of the memory of the dead and of the intentional defamation of the Jewish people was not a violation of the Article 10 (freedom of expression) of the European Convention on Human Rights. Also, the ECtHR also decided by four votes to three that there had been no violation of Article 6 § 1 (right to a fair trial) of the European Convention on Human Rights.

References

External links

Udo Pastörs
 (German) Udo Pastörs (Website of Parliament of the State of Mecklenburg-Vorpommern)
 (German) Udo Pastörs (NPD party website)
 (German) Udo Pastörs  (Kandidatenwatch.de)

Criticism
 (German) Gernot Knödler: NPD will nicht stolpern. taz Nord vom 17. Juni 2006
 (German) Lagebericht Rechtsextremismus März 2006
 (German) Focus: NPD-Spitzenkandidat - Hitler als Phänomen gewürdigt
 (German) NDR: Staatsanwalt prüft Rede von NPD-Fraktionschef Pastörs; inklusive Link zu einem Radiobeitrag zu Pastörs demokratiefeindliche Rede
 (German) Spiegel.de: NPD-Fraktionschef nach Hetzrede im Visier der Staatsanwaltschaft

1952 births
German nationalists
Living people
Members of the Landtag of Mecklenburg-Western Pomerania
National Democratic Party of Germany politicians
People from Wegberg
German people convicted of Holocaust denial